Robert Arbuthnot, 1st Viscount of Arbuthnott PC (before 1625 – 10 October 1655) was a Scottish Peer and Scottish Privy Counsellor (1649).

He was a son of Sir Robert Arbuthnott, 17th laird of Arbuthnott (normally referred to as Arbuthnott, of that Ilk) by Sir Robert's second wife, Margaret daughter of Simon Fraser, 6th Lord Lovat.

He married, firstly, Marjory Carnegie (daughter of David Carnegie, 1st Earl of Southesk), sometime before 1639, and had two children:
Hon. Margaret Arbuthnot (before 1644–?)
Sir Robert Arbuthnot, 2nd Viscount of Arbuthnott (before 1648–16 June 1682)

He married, secondly, his first cousin Katherine Fraser (daughter of Hugh Fraser, 7th Lord Lovat, on 30 June 1653 and had further children.

He was knighted by King Charles I "for his enduring loyalty", and was a Ruling Elder in the General Assembly of the Church of Scotland in 1641.

He was created 1st Viscount of Arbuthnott, of County Kincardine and 1st Lord Inverbervie, Kincardineshire, on 16 November 1641 by Charles I who was trying to persuade him to support the Royalist cause.

References

Books

External links
 

1655 deaths
Scottish knights
Members of the Privy Council of Scotland
Robert Arbuthnot, 1st Viscount of
Year of birth uncertain
Ordained peers
Elders of the Church of Scotland
Peers of Scotland created by Charles I
Members of the Convention of the Estates of Scotland 1643–44
Members of the Parliament of Scotland 1648–1651
1